The Knave of Diamonds is a 1913 romance novel by the British writer Ethel M. Dell.

Adaptation
In 1921 it was adapted by Stoll Pictures into a silent film of the same title directed by René Plaissetty.

References

Bibliography
 Goble, Alan. The Complete Index to Literary Sources in Film. Walter de Gruyter, 1999.
 Vinson, James. Twentieth-Century Romance and Gothic Writers. Macmillan, 1982.

1913 British novels
British romance novels
Novels by Ethel M. Dell
British novels adapted into films